Jim Harris is an American novelist. He has written three acclaimed novels in the 21st Century, one of which was nominated for a Pen USA award. He writes comic novels about the human condition with characters who are almost always marginalized.  His style is often compared to Tom Robbins and Kurt Vonnegut but his content is rougher-edged and often compared to Jim Thompson and Cormac McCarthy with more comic overtones.  His unique approach to his characters delineates him from most other comic American male writers, as females are the lead characters in all of his novels.  While his prose is, for the most part, gritty and simple, as he addresses gritty and rough topics, the playfulness of his prose stops him from being addressed with more attention by academics, who normally, acknowledge condescending minimalism passing off as poetic prose that usually just makes fun of marginalized characters and their plight.

His plots and stylistic renderings are often borrowed by others.  The latest being the subplot of a Mexican Woman and little boy being chased by drug lords as they escape to America.  This plot is from his novel, As God Looked On (2016) and was lifted by Jeanne Cummins for her commercial work, American Dirt (2020).  While As God Looked On ends with the critical phrase, American Dust, Cummins changes it to American Dirt.

Jim Harris is close to finishing his next novel, Delaney and the Bomb.  A novel set in Tybee Island, GA.

Works 
	2001 Nowhere Near the Sea of Cortez (Willowgate Press)
	2007 A Bottle of Rain (Livingston Press, The University of West Alabama)
	2016 AS God Looked On (Livingston Press, The University of West Alabama)

21st-century American novelists
American male novelists
Eastern Illinois University alumni
1957 births
Living people
20th-century American novelists
20th-century American male writers
21st-century American male writers